Róbert Kresťanko (born 26 June 1972) is a Slovak bobsledder. He competed at the 2002 Winter Olympics and the 2006 Winter Olympics.

References

External links
 

1972 births
Living people
Slovak male bobsledders
Olympic bobsledders of Slovakia
Bobsledders at the 2002 Winter Olympics
Bobsledders at the 2006 Winter Olympics
Sportspeople from Bojnice